Susan Eloise Hinton (better known as S. E. Hinton) is an American author who is best known for writing young adult fiction. The Outsiders was Hinton's first published book in 1967; Hinton started the book at the age of fifteen. Hinton based the characters, the Greasers and the Socs, off of teenage gangs and alienated youth in her hometown of Tulsa, Oklahoma during the 1960s. The Outsiders has sold over fourteen million copies since it was published. In 1983, The Outsiders became a movie, and was later released onto DVD. After experiencing a writer's block and going into a state of depression, Hinton met somebody in her freshmen biology class, who inspired her to continue writing.

Hinton followed the advice given to her and wrote her second novel, That Was Then, This Is Now in 1971. Following that, she wrote her shortest novel, Rumble Fish; it was published in 1975 after she had published a short story version in a 1968 edition of University of Tulsa's Alumni Magazine. Four years later in 1979, Tex was published and would be Hinton's last book for nine years as she devoted her time to raise her child. Hinton's next novel Taming the Star Runner was her first book that wasn't written in first-person point of view. Seven years after Taming the Star Runner, Hinton released her first children's book, Big David, Little David, which followed with the release of The Puppy Sister in 1995. In 2004, Hawkes Harbor, Hinton's first adult novel, was released. Hinton's most recent book, Some of Tim's Stories, was published in 2007 and is Hinton's third children's book. Overall, Hinton has written nine published books.

Hinton has won many awards for her books. Hinton has won the "ALA Best Books for Young Adults Award" four times; she won the award for That Was Then, This Is Now (in 1971), Rumble Fish (in 1975) and for Tex and Taming the Star Runner (in 1979). Hinton has also won a "School Library Journal Best Books of the Year Award" for Rumble Fish (in 1975), and Tex and Taming the Star Runner (in 1979). In 1979, Hinton received three other awards for both Tex and Taming the Star Runner. Hinton's first and only award for a children's book is the "Parent's Choice Silver Honor Book Award," which she won for The Puppy Sister. Overall, Hinton has won 19 awards from 21 nominations.

Books

Awards won by S. E. Hinton

References
General

 

Specific

External links
Official website

Bibliographies by writer
Bibliographies of American writers

Children's literature bibliographies